The 2023 Men's EuroHockey Championship will be the nineteenth edition of the Men's EuroHockey Championship, the biennial international men's field hockey championship of Europe organised by the European Hockey Federation.

The tournament will be held alongside the women's tournament from 19 to 27 August 2023 at the Warsteiner HockeyPark, in Mönchengladbach, Germany. The winner will qualify for the 2024 Summer Olympics.

Qualification

Along with the host nation Germany, the top three teams at the 2021 EuroHockey Championship and the four winners of the 2022 EuroHockey Championship Qualifiers will field the men's tournament.

Preliminary round
All times are local (UTC+2).

Pool A

Pool B

Fifth to eighth place classification
The points obtained in the preliminary round against the other team will be carried over.

First to fourth place classification

Semi-finals

Third and fourth place

Final

Final standings

See also
 2023 Men's EuroHockey Championship II
 2023 Women's EuroHockey Championship

References

External links

 
Men's EuroHockey Nations Championship
Men 1
EuroHockey Championship
International field hockey competitions hosted by Germany
EuroHockey Championship
Sport in Mönchengladbach
Eurohockey Championship
21st century in Mönchengladbach
Field hockey at the Summer Olympics – Men's European qualification
EuroHockey Championship